The 1925 Princeton Tigers football team was an American football team that represented Princeton University as an independent during the 1925 college football season. In its 12th season under head coach Bill Roper, the team compiled a 5–1–1 record and outscored opponents by a total of 125 to 44.  The team's sole loss was to Colgate by a 9–0 score.

Princeton center Ed McMillan was a consensus first-team honoree on the 1925 College Football All-America Team, and fullback Jacob Slagle was picked as a first-team honoree by the United Press.

Schedule

References

Princeton
Princeton Tigers football seasons
Princeton Tigers football